Saint Sebald is an unincorporated community in Clayton County, Iowa, United States. Saint Sebald has one Lutheran church and a cemetery. The county seat of Elkader lies approximately 11 miles to the northeast.

References

Unincorporated communities in Clayton County, Iowa
Unincorporated communities in Iowa